Rajkushma is a village in the Paschim Medinipur District in West Bengal, India. It lies on the Silda-Parihati road and is neighboured by the villages of Ashakanthi, Joypur, Posdaand, and Kishoripur. The village has a primary school by the name of Ashakanthi Primary School, though it is not located in the Ashakanthi mouza. The population is made up of people from the Karmakar, Gandhabanik, Teli, Bhuina and Karia-Lodha-Sobar castes.

Villages in Paschim Medinipur district